Bethel African Methodist Episcopal Church is a historic African Methodist Episcopal church and parsonage located at Franklin, Johnson County, Indiana. The church was built in 1911, and is a one-story, front gable frame building with a medium-pitched gable on hip roof.  It features a simple two-story square tower topped by a square cupola and a large projecting semi-hexagonal apse. The associated parsonage was built about 1925.

It was listed on the National Register of Historic Places in 2015.

References

Churches on the National Register of Historic Places in Indiana
Churches completed in 1911
African Methodist Episcopal churches in Indiana
Churches in Johnson County, Indiana
National Register of Historic Places in Johnson County, Indiana